"Second Sight" is the eighth episode of the third series of the 1960s cult British spy-fi television series The Avengers, starring Patrick Macnee and Honor Blackman. It was first broadcast by ABC on 16 November 1963. The episode was directed by Peter Hammond and written by Martin Woodhouse.

Plot
A multi-millionaire is about to receive a corneal graft to treat his blindness. Steed is tasked with escorting the live corneas from Switzerland to London. However, when the eye surgeon involved expresses concerns about the operation, he is murdered, causing Steed to mount his own investigation. Mrs Gale plays a doctor.

Cast
 Patrick Macnee as John Steed
 Honor Blackman as Cathy Gale 
 John Carson as Marten Halvarssen 
 Judy Bruce as Eve Hawn 
 Peter Bowles as Neil Anstice 
 Ronald Adam as Dr. Spender 
 Steven Scott as Dr. Vilner 
 Terry Brewer as Steiner

References

External links

Episode overview on The Avengers Forever! website

The Avengers (season 3) episodes
1963 British television episodes